Leccinum melaneum is a species of fungi belonging to the family Boletaceae.

It is native to Europe and Northern America.

References

melaneum